is a Japanese former footballer who played the entirety of his career for Vanraure Hachinohe.

Career
Kanai retired at the end of the 2019 season.

Club statistics

Notes

References

External links

1989 births
Living people
Japanese footballers
Association football midfielders
Japan Football League players
J3 League players
Shonan Bellmare players
Vanraure Hachinohe players